Soldier Run is a stream in the U.S. state of Pennsylvania. It is a tributary of Sandy Lick Creek.

Soldier Run took its name from nearby Big Soldier coal mine.

See also
List of rivers of Pennsylvania

References

Rivers of Clearfield County, Pennsylvania
Rivers of Jefferson County, Pennsylvania
Rivers of Pennsylvania